was an early karate practitioner.  was a social class of the Ryūkyū Kingdom.

The principles of the dō ("way"), as explained by Takahara Pēchin, are: 1) ijō, the way-compassion, humility, and love. 2) katsu, the laws-complete understanding of all techniques and forms of karate, and 3) fo dedication-the seriousness of karate that must be understood not only in practice, but in actual combat. The collective translation is: "One’s duty to himself and his fellow man." 

He was the first teacher of Sakukawa "Tode" Kanga who was to become known as the "father of Okinawan karate.".

References 

Okinawan male karateka
1683 births
1760 deaths
Ryukyuan people